Fencamine (Altimina, Sicoclor) is a psychostimulant drug of the amphetamine class. It is closely related to fenethylline.

References 

Substituted amphetamines
Norepinephrine-dopamine releasing agents
Xanthines